Alpha is a borough in Warren County, in the U.S. state of New Jersey. As of the 2020 United States census, the borough's population was 2,328, a decrease of 41 (−1.7%) from the 2,369 enumerated at the 2010 census, which in turn reflected a decline of 113 (−4.6%) from the 2,482 counted at the 2000 census.

Alpha was incorporated as a borough from portions of Pohatcong Township by an act of the New Jersey Legislature passed on June 26, 1911, and signed by Governor Woodrow Wilson, based on the results of a referendum held on May 31, 1911. The borough was named for the Alpha Cement Works.

History
Formally known as Vulcanite, Alpha was incorporated on June 26, 1911, but its history can be traced back to a much earlier date. At the time of the Great Blizzard of 1888, there were only seven houses in what is now the corporate limits of Alpha. The exact date on which the first house in Alpha is uncertain. One of the first homes in the community was a two-room log cabin constructed by the Pursel family beside an old Indian Trail on the former property of the Vulcanite Portland Cement Company, now New Brunswick Avenue.

Less than two years after incorporating, the community obtained a continuation of the streetcar line from Phillipsburg and electric street lights were installed.

Geography
According to the U.S. Census Bureau, the borough had a total area of 1.72 square miles (4.44 km2), including 1.68 square miles (4.35 km2) of land and 0.04 square miles (0.09 km2) of water (2.03%).

Unincorporated communities, localities and place names located partially or completely within the borough include Vulcanite.

The borough is completely surrounded by Pohatcong Township, making it part of 21 pairs of "doughnut towns" in the state, where one municipality entirely surrounds another.

Demographics

Census 2010

The Census Bureau's 2006–2010 American Community Survey showed that (in 2010 inflation-adjusted dollars) median household income was $63,953 (with a margin of error of +/− $7,724) and the median family income was $73,929 (+/− $6,822). Males had a median income of $49,461 (+/− $3,100) versus $40,859 (+/− $5,262) for females. The per capita income for the borough was $28,567 (+/− $2,455). About 4.0% of families and 5.1% of the population were below the poverty line, including 9.8% of those under age 18 and 4.9% of those age 65 or over.

Census 2000
As of the 2000 U.S. census, there were 2,482 people, 989 households, and 688 families residing in the borough. The population density was 1,462.0 people per square mile (563.7/km2). There were 1,034 housing units at an average density of 609.1 per square mile (234.8/km2). The racial makeup of the borough was 97.06% White, 0.28% African American, 0.04% Native American, 1.21% Asian, 0.64% from other races, and 0.77% from two or more races. Hispanic or Latino of any race were 1.89% of the population.

There were 989 households, out of which 31.2% had children under the age of 18 living with them, 54.6% were married couples living together, 11.0% had a female householder with no husband present, and 30.4% were non-families. 26.9% of all households were made up of individuals, and 13.7% had someone living alone who was 65 years of age or older. The average household size was 2.50 and the average family size was 3.05.

In the borough, the population was spread out, with 24.4% under the age of 18, 6.0% from 18 to 24, 31.3% from 25 to 44, 20.7% from 45 to 64, and 17.5% who were 65 years of age or older. The median age was 38 years. For every 100 females, there were 94.8 males. For every 100 females age 18 and over, there were 90.1 males.

The median income for a household in the borough was $42,209, and the median income for a family was $45,435. Males had a median income of $39,957 versus $26,576 for females. The per capita income for the borough was $20,104. About 5.5% of families and 7.6% of the population were below the poverty line, including 14.1% of those under age 18 and 9.7% of those age 65 or over.

Government

Local government
Alpha is governed under the Borough form of New Jersey municipal government, which is used in 218 municipalities (of the 564) statewide, making it the most common form of government in New Jersey. The governing body is comprised of the Mayor and the Borough Council, with all positions elected at-large on a partisan basis as part of the November general election. The Mayor is elected directly by the voters to a four-year term of office. The Borough Council is comprised of six members elected to serve three-year terms on a staggered basis, with two seats coming up for election each year in a three-year cycle. The Borough form of government used by Alpha is a "weak mayor / strong council" government in which council members act as the legislative body with the mayor presiding at meetings and voting only in the event of a tie. The mayor can veto ordinances subject to an override by a two-thirds majority vote of the council. The mayor makes committee and liaison assignments for council members, and most appointments are made by the mayor with the advice and consent of the council.

, the Mayor of Alpha Borough is Republican Craig S. Dunwell, whose term of office ends December 31, 2023. Members of the Alpha Borough Council are Council President Robert J. Melick Jr. (R, 2023), Angela Bickar (I, 2022; elected to serve an unexpired term), Louis J. Cartabona (R, 2023), Todd W. Pantuso (R, 2022), Peter Petinelli (R, 2024) and Jodie Smith (R, 2024). Angela Bickar was elected to fill the seat expiring in December 2022 that had been held by Edward Hanics Jr.

Republican councilmember Jack Preiss and Democrat Kathleen Ronan, both serving terms ending in December 2018, resigned from office in September 2016. Preiss cited time conflicts with his work duties, while Ronan expressed her frustrations with working with the rest of the council. Louis Cartabona was chosen to fill the seat held by Preiss. In October, the council selected Jennifer Gable from a list of three nominees submitted by the Democratic municipal committee to fill Ronan's vacant seat. In the 2017 general election, Louis J. Cartabona and Alan Singleton were elected to serve the balance of the two unexpired terms of office.

Harry Zikas became the state's youngest mayor ever when he took office in 2000 at the age of 21. Zikas announced his resignation from office in September 2014, citing his acceptance of a job in Northern New Jersey. With Mayor Ed Hanics casting the tiebreaking vote, Tracy Grossman was selected in October 2014 to fill the remainder of Zikas's term of office.

In January 2014, the borough council selected Millard Rooks to fill the vacant seat expiring in December 2015 of Michael Savary, who had resigned after pleading guilty to disorderly tampering with public records.

Federal, state and county representation
Alpha is located in the 7th Congressional district and is part of New Jersey's 23rd state legislative district.

Politics
As of March 23, 2011, there were a total of 1,441 registered voters in Alpha, of which 548 (38.0% vs. 21.5% countywide) were registered as Democrats, 296 (20.5% vs. 35.3%) were registered as Republicans and 596 (41.4% vs. 43.1%) were registered as Unaffiliated. There was one voter registered to another party. Among the borough's 2010 Census population, 60.8% (vs. 62.3% in Warren County) were registered to vote, including 78.7% of those ages 18 and over (vs. 81.5% countywide).

In the 2012 presidential election, Democrat Barack Obama received 497 votes (51.1% vs. 40.8% countywide), ahead of Republican Mitt Romney with 436 votes (44.8% vs. 56.0%) and other candidates with 25 votes (2.6% vs. 1.7%), among the 973 ballots cast by the borough's 1,457 registered voters, for a turnout of 66.8% (vs. 66.7% in Warren County). In the 2008 presidential election, Republican John McCain received 470 votes (47.7% vs. 55.2% countywide), ahead of Democrat Barack Obama with 464 votes (47.1% vs. 41.4%) and other candidates with 18 votes (1.8% vs. 1.6%), among the 985 ballots cast by the borough's 1,408 registered voters, for a turnout of 70.0% (vs. 73.4% in Warren County). In the 2004 presidential election, Republican George W. Bush received 510 votes (50.1% vs. 61.0% countywide), ahead of Democrat John Kerry with 489 votes (48.0% vs. 37.2%) and other candidates with 12 votes (1.2% vs. 1.3%), among the 1,018 ballots cast by the borough's 1,369 registered voters, for a turnout of 74.4% (vs. 76.3% in the whole county).

In the 2013 gubernatorial election, Republican Chris Christie received 70.0% of the vote (442 cast), ahead of Democrat Barbara Buono with 26.9% (170 votes), and other candidates with 3.0% (19 votes), among the 651 ballots cast by the borough's 1,471 registered voters (20 ballots were spoiled), for a turnout of 44.3%. In the 2009 gubernatorial election, Republican Chris Christie received 334 votes (48.2% vs. 61.3% countywide), ahead of Democrat Jon Corzine with 251 votes (36.2% vs. 25.7%), Independent Chris Daggett with 64 votes (9.2% vs. 9.8%) and other candidates with 21 votes (3.0% vs. 1.5%), among the 693 ballots cast by the borough's 1,397 registered voters, yielding a 49.6% turnout (vs. 49.6% in the county).

Education
Students in pre-kindergarten through eighth grade for public school attend the Alpha School District at Alpha School. As of the 2018–19 school year, the district, comprised of one school, had an enrollment of 211 students and 24.5 classroom teachers (on an FTE basis), for a student–teacher ratio of 8.6:1. In the 2016–2017 school year, Alpha had the 42nd smallest enrollment of any school district in the state, with 194 students.

Public school students in ninth through twelfth grades attend Phillipsburg High School in Phillipsburg, which serves students from Alpha as part of a sending/receiving relationship with the Phillipsburg School District. The high school also serves students from four other sending communities: Bloomsbury (in Hunterdon County), Greenwich Township, Lopatcong Township and Pohatcong Township. As of the 2018–19 school year, the high school had an enrollment of 1,650 students and 126.5 classroom teachers (on an FTE basis), for a student–teacher ratio of 13.0:1.

Students from the borough and from all of Warren County are eligible to attend Ridge and Valley Charter School in Blairstown (for grades K–8) or Warren County Technical School in Washington borough (for 9–12), with special education services provided by local districts supplemented throughout the county by the Warren County Special Services School District in Oxford Township (for Pre-K–12).

Transportation

The main road that goes through is CR 519. Route 122 runs through briefly in the north.

While Interstate 78 passes through the southern portion of the borough, the closest access point is at US 22 in neighboring Pohatcong.

The Norfolk Southern Railway's Lehigh Line (formerly the mainline of the Lehigh Valley Railroad), runs through Alpha on its way to Phillipsburg, New Jersey.

Notable people

People who were born in, residents of, or otherwise closely associated with Alpha include:

 Joe Buzas (1919–2003), Minor League Baseball executive who played one season with the New York Yankees
 Hector A. Cafferata Jr. (1929–2016), United States Marine who received the Medal of Honor for his actions at the Battle of Chosin Reservoir during the Korean War
 Jack Orchulli (born 1946), politician
 Jennie Somogyi (born 1977/78), ballet dancer who joined the New York City Ballet in 1993, at age 15, became a principal dancer in 2000, and retired in 2015

References

External links

 Borough of Alpha official website

 
1911 establishments in New Jersey
Borough form of New Jersey government
Boroughs in Warren County, New Jersey
Populated places established in 1911